Len Salvemini (born July 22, 1953 in Danville, California) is a retired American soccer player who spent three season in the Major Indoor Soccer League.

Career
In 1971, Salvemini graduated from St. Ignatius College Preparatory where he set the West Catholic Athletic League career and single season scoring records.  He then attended the United States Air Force Academy where he played on the men's soccer team from 1971 to 1974.  He was a 1972 Honorable Mention (third team) and 1974 Second Team All American.  His sixty-four career goals and 149 career points remain Falcon records.  In 1975, he graduated with a commission as a second lieutenant in the United States Air Force. Salvemini played for the U.S. Olympic soccer team during its unsuccessful qualification campaign for the 1976 Summer Olympics.  He scored the second U.S. goal in a 2–3 loss to Bermuda on April 20, 1975. He represented the United States at the 1975 Pan American Games in Mexico.   In 1980, he turned professional with the San Francisco Fog of the  Major Indoor Soccer League.  He moved to the Kansas City Comets for the 1981–1982 season and finished his career with the Memphis Americans in 1983–1984.  He continued his military career and retired as a captain.  His brother Dan also played professionally.

References

External links
 MISL stats

1953 births
People from Daly City, California
Soccer players from California
Air Force Falcons men's soccer players
American soccer players
Kansas City Comets (original MISL) players
Major Indoor Soccer League (1978–1992) players
Memphis Americans players
San Francisco Fog (MISL) players
United States Air Force Academy alumni
Living people
Association football defenders
Pan American Games competitors for the United States
Footballers at the 1975 Pan American Games
Sportspeople from the San Francisco Bay Area
Military personnel from California